Final Verdict (1991) is a TNT drama film starring Treat Williams, Olivia Burnette and Glenn Ford. It was directed by Jack Fisk.  The movie is based on the 1962 biography of the same title by Hearst journalist Adela Rogers St. Johns.  The book and the movie tell the story of her father, Los Angeles  defense attorney Earl Rogers, upon whom Earl Stanley Gardner based the character Perry Mason.  (The author is depicted under her middle name, "Nora.")

This was the last work of Hollywood legend Glenn Ford, and the last onscreen appearance of actress Dana Hill.

Plot
This story takes place in the 1920s, where the successful and controversial defense attorney Earl Rogers is known for his controversial behavior in the courtroom and for his innovative methods. His father, the Reverend Rogers, instilled in his children moral values which Rogers puts into practice during the trial. He has a beautiful and faithful woman named Belle, and daughter Nora.

Cast

References
 The Hollywood reporter, by Wilkerson Daily Corp.

External links
 

1991 drama films
1991 television films
1991 films
TNT Network original films
Films directed by Jack Fisk
Films based on works by Adela Rogers St. Johns
1990s English-language films